Alexander Cole Jr. (born August 17, 1965) is an American former professional baseball outfielder.

Career
Drafted by the St. Louis Cardinals in the 2nd round of the 1985 MLB amateur draft, Cole would make his Major League debut with the Cleveland Indians on July 27, 1990, and appear in his final game on May 22, 1996. Known as a stolen base threat (Cole ranked fourth in the American League in 1990 with 40 stolen bases despite playing in only 63 games), the Indians in 1991 cited his speed as a prime reason for moving the outfield walls of Cleveland Municipal Stadium back. This effort, however, resulted in the Indians hitting only 22 home runs at home for the year. After being traded from the Indians midway through the 1992 season, Cole briefly played with the Pittsburgh Pirates before becoming a member of the inaugural Colorado Rockies team in 1993.

After spending two years with the Minnesota Twins, Cole signed with the Boston Red Sox and spent most of the 1996 season with their AAA squad. His final game was May 22, 1996.

Cole spent most of the rest of his baseball career in the independent minor leagues. He started off 1997 playing for the Madison Black Wolf of the Northern League, then was acquired by the Florida Marlins and placed on their then top affiliate, the Charlotte Knights. He would play in the Mexican League in 1998 before finishing his career playing three years with the Bridgeport Bluefish of the Atlantic League of Professional Baseball.

External links
, or Retrosheet, or Pura Pelota (Venezuelan Winter League)

1965 births
Living people
African-American baseball players
American expatriate baseball players in Mexico
American sportspeople convicted of crimes
American people convicted of drug offenses
Arkansas Travelers players
Baseball players from North Carolina
Boston Red Sox players
Bridgeport Bluefish players
Charlotte Knights players
Cleveland Indians players
Colorado Rockies players
Colorado Springs Sky Sox players
Johnson City Cardinals players
Las Vegas Stars (baseball) players
Louisville Redbirds players
Madison Black Wolf players
Major League Baseball center fielders
Mayas de Chetumal players
Minnesota Twins players
Pawtucket Red Sox players
Pittsburgh Pirates players
SCF Manatees baseball players
Sportspeople from Fayetteville, North Carolina
St. Petersburg Cardinals players
State College of Florida, Manatee–Sarasota alumni
Sultanes de Monterrey players
Tigres de Aragua players
American expatriate baseball players in Venezuela
21st-century African-American people
20th-century African-American sportspeople